Benedictine Sisters may refer to any of the following Benedictine religious orders:
Benedictine Sisters of the Reparation of the Holy Face
Benedictine Sisters of Perpetual Adoration
Benedictine Sisters of Elk County
Benedictine Sisters of St. Walburg Monastery of Covington, Kentucky